Gold Digger (May 28, 1962 - February 21, 1990) was an American Thoroughbred racemare who won back-to-back runnings of the Gallorette Handicap but is most famous for being the Dam of Mr. Prospector.

Background

Gold Digger's name came from the highly publicized 1955 murder of William Woodward Jr. who owned Gold Digger's sire, Nashua. The word "gold digger" refers to a person who engages in a relationship for money instead of love.

Career
Owned by Combs wife Dorothy (née Enslow), Gold Digger was trained by Jouett Reed. Gold Digger's first race was on January 1, 1964 in which she finished 3rd in the Matron Stakes. 1964 proved to be a winless year for Gold Digger. She won the 1965 Columbiana Handicap in February 1965.

Gold Digger captured the September 1965 Marigold Stakes at Latonia Race Track in Kentucky, then in October won the Yo Tambien Handicap at Chicago's Hawthorne Race Course. She then won the November 1965 Gallorette Handicap at Pimlico Race Course in Baltimore. She got her last victory on May 7, 1966, capturing the Gallorette Handicap for the second time.

Gold Digger was retired from breeding in 1984 and was euthanized on February 21, 1990.

Stud career

Gold Digger's descendants include: 
c = colt, f = filly

Pedigree

References

1962 racehorse births
1990 racehorse deaths
Racehorses bred in Kentucky
Racehorses trained in the United States
Thoroughbred family 13-c